Ecrinesomus is an extinct genus of prehistoric bobasatraniiform ray-finned fish that lived during the Induan stage of the Early Triassic epoch in what is now Madagascar.

See also

 Prehistoric fish
 List of prehistoric bony fish

References

Late Triassic fish
Prehistoric animals of Madagascar